The 2018 Friuli-Venezia Giulia regional election took place on 29 April 2018, to elect the President and the Regional council of the Italian autonomous region of Friuli-Venezia Giulia. 

The election saw a large victory of the centre-right candidate, Massimiliano Fedriga, with more than 57% of votes and a great showing of the League, followed by the centre-left candidate Sergio Bolzonello, who arrived second with almost 27% of votes, and the Five Star one, who gained less than 12% of votes.

Background
In the 2013 regional election, the centre-left candidate, Debora Serracchiani, a Socialist MEP and regional leader of the Democratic Party (PD), narrowly defeated incumbent Renzo Tondo of The People of Freedom (PdL) 39.39% to 39.00%; Saverio Galluccio of the Five Star Movement (M5S) came third with 19.2% of the vote. Serracchiani was the second woman to hold the office of President of Friuli-Venezia Giulia, after Alessandra Guerra of the Northern League in 1994–1995.

However in 2017 Serracchiani announced her intention not to seek a re-election and the centre-left selected Sergio Bolzonello, former mayor of Pordenone, as the candidate for the presidency. The centre-right coalition choose Massimiliano Fedriga, a member of the Chamber of Deputies for the League and a close ally of Matteo Salvini, as its candidate; while the Five Star Movement's candidate was Alessandro Fraleoni Morgera, a former member of the right-wing party, National Alliance. The former mayor of Udine, Sergio Cecotti, run as an independent at the head of an autonomist list.

Parties and candidates

Opinion polling 
This section reports in chronological order the data of the electoral surveys related to this election. The percentages attributed to the candidates are relative to the part of the sample that expresses a voting intention.

Results

Analysis
Similar to the election in Molise, the M5S lost almost 20% of votes compared to the general election. On March 4, they reached almost 25%, but now just over 7%. By contrast, the centre-right coalition gained more than 20% compared to March 4.

See also 
 2018 Italian general election
 2018 Molise regional election

References 

Elections in Friuli-Venezia Giulia
2018 elections in Italy
April 2018 events in Italy